is a Japanese former professional sumo wrestler from Aomori. He joined professional sumo in 1981, reaching the top makuuchi division just two years later. He reached the second highest rank of ōzeki in 1987 and became the 63rd yokozuna in the history of the sport in 1990 at the age of 30. He won four tournaments and was a runner-up on nine other occasions. He retired in 1992 and is now the head coach of Isegahama stable. As a coach he has produced two yokozuna himself, Harumafuji and Terunofuji.

Early life
He was born in the fishing town of Kizukuri in Nishitsugaru District. His father, who worked as an electrician, was a keen amateur sumo enthusiast and Vice President of the Prefectural Sumo Federation. He was determined to see his son succeed in sumo and even built a dohyō in the garden for him to practise. Asahifuji also did well at sumo at school, finishing third in a national schoolboy competition, and later winning the West Japan Student Newcomers tournament while studying at Kinki University. However, tiring of the never-ending training, he gave up sumo for a while and spent his time fishing. Eventually an acquaintance of his father introduced him to Ōshima-oyakata, former ōzeki Asahikuni, who had recently opened his own heya or stable of wrestlers, Ōshima stable.

Early sumo career
Asahifuji made his professional debut in January 1981. He was already 20 years old, considerably older than most new recruits who tended to be 15 or 16 at the time. However, because of his amateur sumo experience he was able to work his way up the ranks very quickly and won tournament championships in the jonokuchi, sandanme and makushita divisions with perfect records. He reached the second highest jūryō division after only eight tournaments, a record that stood unbeaten until 2008. He was promoted to the top makuuchi division in March 1983. He won his first special prize for Fighting Spirit in the November 1984 tournament, where he finished runner-up. He reached sekiwake rank for the first time in January 1986. After regular training sessions at Takasago stable, where he knew Asashio from his university days, he began to develop a more rounded technique, and after three double figure records he was promoted to sumo's second highest rank of ōzeki after the September 1987 tournament.

Ōzeki
In January 1988 Asahifuji won his first top division tournament championship, which was also the first for the Tatsunami-Isegahama icihimon or group of stables in nearly twenty years. In 1989 he won 40 out of a possible 45 bouts in the first three championships of the year and came very close to promotion to the highest rank of yokozuna, but he was defeated by yokozuna Hokutoumi in playoffs in both January and May 1989. His 13–2 record in May was his fifth consecutive runner-up performance, and his seventh overall, but he had been unable to win two tournaments in a row, regarded by the Japan Sumo Association as the minimum requirement for yokozuna promotion after the embarrassment of Futahaguro's brief tenure at sumo top's rank.

After managing only 8–7 in the following tournament in July, Asahifuji endured a long slump. This was partly caused by longstanding pancreatic trouble, which had first been diagnosed in 1984 and had also afflicted his stablemaster during his active days. After a string of mediocre 8–7 and 9–6 scores it seemed Asahifuji would finish his career as an ōzeki. However, by mid-1990 his health began to improve, and after encouragement from his stablemaster, who reminded him that he would soon turn 30 years of age and was down to his last chance, he won consecutive championships in May and July 1990. He scored 14–1 in both tournaments, securing his yokozuna promotion on the final day in July by defeating yokozuna Chiyonofuji for only the fifth time in 28 meetings.

Yokozuna
Asahifuji began his yokozuna career with 12 straight wins in the September 1990 tournament, but he lost to Kirishima on Day 13 and was defeated by Hokutoumi in the championship deciding bout on the final day. In November 1990 he finished runner-up again, to Chiyonofuji. In January and March 1991 he posted reasonable scores of 11–4 but was never really in contention for the championship in either tournament, although he did have a memorable win over the young rising star Takahanada in March. He had to wait until May 1991 for his first title as a yokozuna, when he defeated Konishiki twice on the last day, once in their regulation match and once in the playoff, to finish with a 14–1 record.

This was to prove Asahifuji's only tournament championship as a yokozuna, as the rest of his career was dogged by illness and injury. He managed only a bare majority of 8–7 in July 1991, the last tournament he was to complete. He pulled out of the September 1991 tournament with an injured shoulder on the sixth day, and hampered by the return of his old pancreatic problems missed the November 1991 tournament altogether. He returned in January 1992 but after losing his opening three bouts to Akebono, his nemesis Akinoshima (for the fifth time in a row) and finally Wakahanada, he announced his retirement at the age of 31. Asahifuji's three bout losing streak from the opening day was equal to the worst ever for a yokozuna in the 15-day era until Kisenosato lost his first four bouts in November 2018. He gave the worsening condition of his pancreas as the reason for his retirement. His danpatsu-shiki or retirement ceremony was held in September 1992. There were no active yokozuna at the time, so he was unable to follow the tradition of having one serve as his tachimochi and tsuyuharai for the event.

After retirement

Asahifuji has remained in the sumo world as a coach. He had married a niece of the former Kasugayama-oyakata (former maegashira Ōnobori) in 1988, and seemed set to revive Kasugayama stable, but instead he took over Ajigawa stable in 1993 due to the poor health of the previous incumbent (former sekiwake Mutsuarashi). The first top division wrestler he produced was Aminishiki in 2000, who reached the sekiwake rank in 2007. Aminishiki's brother Asōfuji, who retired in 2011 after a match-fixing scandal, was also briefly a top division wrestler. In November 2007 Asahifuji acquired the prestigious Isegahama elder name and renamed his stable Isegahama stable. (The Ajigawa name was acquired by Aminishiki and was loaned to Shikishima of Michinoku stable until July 2012, when Shikishima switched to the Urakaze name.) He has also worked as a judge at tournament matches.

Asahifuji's greatest success as a trainer came first with Harumafuji, who he recruited in 2001 and who initially fought under the shikona of Ama. Harumafuji reached the second highest rank of ōzeki in November 2008 and won his first top division championship in May 2009. Harumafuji took his second championship in July 2011, the same tournament in which Takarafuji, like Asahifuji a Kinki University graduate, made his top division debut. Homarefuji reached jūryō in 2012, and in September of that year Harumafuji was promoted to yokozuna following two consecutive 15–0 championships. Isegahama had motivated Harumafuji by telling him before his July 2011 championship, "If you are content with being ozeki then it is all over. You do not become a yokozuna just by wanting to be a yokozuna." Like Asahifuji, Harumafuji performed the yokozuna ring entering ceremony or dohyō-iri in the Shiranui style. He has continued to produce top wrestlers, with Takarafuji reaching komusubi rank and Terunofuji, inherited from the defunct Magaki stable, being promoted to ōzeki, both in 2015. Terunofuji fell to the jonidan division through injury in 2019. Isegahama refused to accept Terunofuji's request to be allowed to retire, and his faith was rewarded when Terunofuji staged a spectacular comeback and reached the yokozuna rank in July 2021. 

He submitted Harumafuji's retirement papers to the Sumo Association on 29 November 2017 after the yokozuna took responsibility for an assault on fellow Mongolian Takanoiwa in a Tottori restaurant and bar the previous month. At a subsequent news conference Isegahama shed tears as he told reporters, "I've watched him grow since he was 16 and have never seen or heard of him being violent before... I can't imagine why it happened." At a meeting on 20 December 2017 the Sumo Association accepted Isegahama's resignation as a director. He was moved to the competition inspection committee as a deputy chairman. He returned to the board of directors in 2020 as head of the judging department. 

Asahifuji turned 60 in July 2020. His kanreki dohyō-iri, originally postponed from May 2020 due to the COVID-19 pandemic, was held at Ryōgoku Kokugikan on 3 October 2021. Two of Isegahama stable's retired wrestlers, Ajigawa (former sekiwake Aminishiki) and yokozuna Harumafuji, served as his tsuyuharai and tachimochi, respectively. He told reporters shortly after the original postponement that he would need to put on weight to be able to wear his tsuna.

On 26 December 2022 Asahifuji again submitted his resignation as a member of the Japan Sumo Association's Board of Directors after it was found that two junior wrestlers in his stable acted violently against younger wrestlers, with the victims beaten with wooden beams and burned with chankonabe hot water poured on their backs. According to the Sumo Association, Asahifuji knew about these incidents but failed to report them. When the board concluded that he should be demoted in sumo's hierarchy as punishment, he instead submitted his resignation. One of the wrestlers held responsible was suspended for two tournaments, while the other had already submitted his retirement papers, which were accepted. Asahifuji's resignation from the board resulted in him vacating his position as the head of the judging department. The following month it was confirmed through the Sumo Association's website that he had been demoted two ranks to yakuin taigu iin (executive member) and was appointed deputy director of the guidance dissemination department.

Fighting style
Asahifuji's favoured kimarite or techniques were listed by the Sumo Association as migi-yotsu (a left hand outside, right hand inside grip on the opponent's mawashi), yorikiri (force out) and uwatedashinage (pulling overarm throw). However, he was also fond of employing more unorthodox techniques little used by other wrestlers and certainly not taught by coaches. He was criticised for this by his stablemaster, the former ōzeki and noted technician Asahikuni, whose view was that by winning by his own idiosyncratic methods, he would be unable to cure his faults. Asahifuji himself claimed in an interview with Channel 4 television to have no favourite technique, but did say that while "everyone likes to throw an opponent, that's not sumo."

Career record

See also
Glossary of sumo terms
List of past sumo wrestlers
List of sumo elders
List of sumo tournament top division champions
List of sumo tournament top division runners-up
List of yokozuna

References

External links 

 Article on Asahifuji

Japanese sumo wrestlers
Sumo people from Aomori Prefecture
People from Tsugaru, Aomori
Yokozuna
1960 births
Living people